A brustolina is a grill which fits over a gas burner on a hob. It consists of a square sheet of metal with holes punched in it (the base) and a square grid over the top (the grilling surface). Heat is applied from below and is evenly distributed by the base, deflected upward to the grid. Items placed on top of the grid are cooked by both convection and radiant heat.
These versatile cooking devices are often used in preparation of Italian cuisine, for instance, grilling bruschetta, polenta, vegetables or toasted pumpkin seeds. They are economical and widely available in street markets in Italy.

References

Italian cuisine
Cookware and bakeware